Coleophora velocella is a moth of the family Coleophoridae. It is found in Kazakhstan.

The larvae feed on the generative organs of Kalidium caspicum.

References

velocella
Moths of Asia
Moths described in 1989